The Pakistan Modern Pentathlon Federation (PMPF) is the governing body for the Olympic sport of modern pentathlon in Pakistan. The Federation was formed in 2014 and has its headquarters in Lahore.

Riaz Fatyana is the President of the federation ever since its inception, having been re-elected in 2019 for a four-year term.

Affiliations 
The Pakistan Modern Pentathlon Federation is affiliated with:
 International Modern Pentathlon Union
 Pakistan Olympic Association

National Championship 
Pakistan Modern Pentathlon Federation organizes the National Modern Pentathlon Championship annually. The most recent edition, 6th National Modern Pentathlon Championship, was held in Lahore in December 2021, in which 100 players from 8 teams took part.
 Punjab (winner)
 Sindh
 Balochistan
 Khyber Pakhtunkhwa
 Gilgit Baltistan
 Islamabad
 Azad Kashmir
 Pakistan Railways

References

External links
 Official website
 Official Facebook page

Sports governing bodies in Pakistan
National members of the Union Internationale de Pentathlon Moderne